Puppet Master: The Littlest Reich is a 2018 American horror comedy film directed by Sonny Laguna and Tommy Wiklund, and written by S. Craig Zahler. The film is the thirteenth entry in the Puppet Master franchise, and is the first film produced by Fangoria under their "Fangoria Presents" label, following their acquisition by Cinestate. It is a reboot of the series, and stars Thomas Lennon, Jenny Pellicer, Nelson Franklin, Barbara Crampton, and Udo Kier. It was released on August 17, 2018, by RLJE Films. As of February 2019, the film has grossed over $600,000 through video sales.

Plot

In Texas of 1989, escaped Nazi war criminal Andre Toulon attempts to engage a bartender in a sexual relationship; he responds with disgust upon learning that she is a lesbian. Later that night, he induces his sentient puppets to attack and kill the woman and her lover. Rookie police officer Carol Doreski follows Toulon to his mansion, where she shoots him to death after he pulls a gun on her.

In 2019, slacker Edgar Easton moves back in with his parents following a divorce. Attempting to put his life back together, he reconnects with his childhood crush, Ashley Sommers, and unearths his deceased younger brother's prized possession, a disturbing puppet he discovered at summer camp shortly before his death. Googling the object, Edgar learns that its name is "Blade" and that it's based on a design by Toulon, who performed puppet shows before the rise of the Third Reich. Discovering that an auction dedicated to original Toulon creations is scheduled at the nearby Brass Buckle hotel, Edgar, Ashley, and Edgar's misanthropic boss Markowitz embark on a road trip to sell the doll.

At the hotel, Edgar and Ashley experience supernatural phenomena such as disturbing phone calls and the Blade puppet moving on its own; the pair also participate in a tour of Toulon's mansion, hosted by the retired Carol Doreski, who now makes her living as a tour guide for Toulon-related media; Doreski informs her guests that Toulon routinely abducted, raped, and tortured Jewish women upon his arrival in America. She also explains that Toulon is now entombed in an adjoining mausoleum, funded by a distant relative and built to architecturally bizarre specifications left behind in Toulon's will. Their first night at the Brass Buckle, Edgar and Ashley realize that his Blade doll is missing and report it to hotel security; their complaint corresponds to a number of inexplicable murders carried out in the hotel the same night. Recognizing the names of several victims from the tour he and Ashely took, Edgar notes that all of the victims were either people of color, Jews, or homosexuals, and suggests that the deaths are hate crimes.

The police gather the hotel guests in the lobby, where the Brass Buckle's bartender, "Cuddly Bear," leads a revolt against the authorities and orchestrates an escape into the parking lot. There, the guests are attacked by sentient puppets, who slaughter most of the people who fled; Edgar, Ashley, Markowitz, and Doreski flee back inside and survive. Based on Edgar's intuition that the puppets are fueled by racist ideology, Markowitz recites a Hanukkah prayer, summoning a puppet to the hotel kitchen; the survivors set upon it an disable it, discovering it to be filled with amethyst. Failing to understand the threat, the survivors split into groups and hide in the hotel. Hearing a guest praying in Hebrew, Markowtiz convinces Edgar to help him stage a rescue attempt. The plan fails, and Markowitz is killed; as he dies, he suggests that Edgar and Ashley jump into a dumpster below their window, using the detritus inside as padding. Nerissa also tries to jump, but dies when she violently hits the side of the dumpster.

Taking Markowitz's advice, Edgar and Ashley jump to safety; meanwhile, the puppets slaughter the remainder of survivors, including Doreski. Edgar intuits that Toulon's mausoleum is integral to the puppet attacks and crashes his truck into it. The attack disables the puppets but results in Toulon's corpse reanimating as a zombie, which attacks and kills Ashley before wandering into the wilderness.

Sometime later, Edgar has achieved success as a comic book artist, documenting his experience at the Brass Buckle. After a fan asks if Toulon has truly been stopped, a visibly disturbed Edgar fails to respond.

Cast

Production
Puppet Master: The Littlest Reich was announced in May 2016 with Di Bonaventura Pictures and Caliber Media (later Cinestate) optioning the film rights and S. Craig Zahler listed as writing the screenplay.

Swedish filmmaking duo Sonny Laguna and Tommy Wiklund were hired to direct the film in 2017. At the same time, Thomas Lennon joined the cast as the lead and Udo Kier had been hired to play the puppet master Andre Toulon. Other cast members included Jenny Pellicer, Nelson Franklin, Charlyne Yi, Alex Beh, Barbara Crampton, Tina Parker, Skeeta Jenkins and Michael Pare. The film began shooting in Dallas, Texas in April.

A veteran Italian composer Fabio Frizzi scored the film.

Release
The film had its world premiere at the Overlook Film Festival on April 20, 2018. The film had its Canadian premiere at the Fantasia International Film Festival in Canada on July 23, 2018. It was released to video on demand on August 17, 2018, and was released on DVD limited release on VHS and Blu-ray on September 25, 2018.

Reception

Critical response
Its consensus reads, "Puppet Master: The Littlest Reich delivers all the proudly distasteful B-movie antics genre fans might expect from a film about murderous Nazi dolls." On Metacritic, the film has a weighted average score of 52 out of 100, based on 12 critics, indicating "Mixed or average reviews".

Cody Hamman from Arrow in the Head rated the film a score of 7/10, writing, "Puppet Master: The Littlest Reich is a ridiculous bloodbath that viewers will hate if they don't agree to meet the film on its own flippant terms and go along for the ride. Viewers who can accept offensive humor will probably have a lot of fun watching it, and might find it to be uncomfortably hilarious." Meagan Navarro from Bloody Disgusting gave the film 4.5 out of 5 skulls, writing, "The Littlest Reich delivers everything that should come with a reboot; a reverence for the original property, its own spin on the mythology, memorable new characters, and more special effects insanity than you thought possible." Noel Murray of the LA Times called the film "good, sick fun", commending the film's "punchy" dialogue, cast, and animation of the puppets. Joshua Rothkopf from Time Out awarded the film 4/5 stars, writing, "The Littlest Reich is no Shoah but it does play around in the slop of real-life genocide and that makes it strangely transgressive. If you’re in the right mood—not too self-serious—you’ll get off on its vengeful payback". Jeannette Catsoulis of The New York Times gave the film a positive review, calling it "certifiably bonkers and cheerfully offensive", commending the film for its humor, while also noting the film's "flimsy" script. John DeFore from The Hollywood Reporter commended the film's performances and humor, while also noting that some viewers might find it offensive.

Not all reviews were positive. 
A.A. Dowd from The A.V. Club called it "a self-satisfied wallow in tastelessness". In his review, Dowd commended the film's gore, and music, but further stated that it was "a little too self-satisfied with its own 'transgressive' mean streak to be much fun." Keith Uhlich of Slant Magazine wrote a particularly scathing review, stating, "What talent Laguna and Wiklund have is of a purely amateurish variety. You can almost see the directors’ fingers moving the puppets through scenes like well-worn action figures, as if they were ‘80s kids filming their every Dadaist thought on a camcorder after renting the first Puppet Master at the local Blockbuster." William Bibbiani from IGN stated that, although the dialogue, performances, and gore were all "unusually good", he felt that the filmmaker's changes made to the franchise had "dramatically reduce[d] the film's entertainment value, and arguably rob[bed] these iconic puppets of the very characteristics that made them special."

Recognition
The film was awarded the Grand Prize at the French Festival international du film fantastique de Gérardmer 2019.

References

External links
 
 
 
 

2018 films
2018 horror films
American comedy horror films
American supernatural horror films
Films about death
Puppet films
Films shot in Dallas
Films scored by Fabio Frizzi
Films scored by Richard Band
Nazi zombie films
2010s English-language films
2010s American films
Reboot films